Parques Polanco is a  mixed-use development in Mexico City at Lago Alberto street #320, Colonia Granada in the new business and residential area of Nuevo Polanco, Mexico City. It was built on the site of Fábricas Automex/Lago Alberto Assembly, a Chrysler assembly plant. The complex includes:
 in Phase I, 5 apartment complexes designed by Higuera + Sánchez, A5 Arquitectura, Ten Arquitectos y KMD México
 in Phase II, two towers designed by Edmonds Internacional.
 in Phase III and IV two towers designed by Arditti Arquitectos
 a retail area with banks, restaurants, shops and a large Sport City gym
 a central park designed by Kees Van Rooij, winner of the AMDI 2010 award in the landscape architecture category
 the 32-story,  BBVA Bancomer back office building (under construction)
The complex has received 2nd place award in the XVIII edition of the "Premio Obras Cemex" awards in the category "Commercial and Mixed Use" (Comercial y de Usos Mixtos).

References

Buildings and structures in Mexico City
Miguel Hidalgo, Mexico City
Mixed-use developments in Mexico
Former motor vehicle assembly plants